Božidar Sandić (Serbian Cyrillic: Божидар Сандић; 26 October 1922 – 1 January 2008) was a Serbian football player.

External links
 Career story at Reprezentacija.rs

1922 births
2008 deaths
Sportspeople from Kikinda
Serbian footballers
Yugoslavia international footballers
SK Jugoslavija players
OFK Beograd players
FK Proleter Zrenjanin players
Association football forwards
Serbian football managers
Yugoslav football managers
Yugoslav footballers